An Act to amend the Telecommunications Act (Internet neutrality) (Bill C-398) was tabled in the Parliament of Canada by the MP for Timmins and James Bay, Charlie Angus, on May 29, 2009, on the second session of the 40th Parliament. Bill C-398 aimed to prohibit various forms of discrimination by telecommunications service providers. "Network management practices that favour, degrade or prioritize any content, application or service transmitted over a broadband network based on its source, ownership, destination or type" are specifically prohibited, subject to certain exceptions. Telecommunications Service providers may use reasonable management practices in order to alleviate extraordinary congestion, may prioritize emergency communications, and assure the security of computers and networks in a reasonable manner. ISPs, according to the proposed Bill, would also be allowed to charge users on a usage-based basis as well as offer directly to users consumer protection services that may discriminate, provided notice is given to users as well as a possibility to opt-out.

The Bill would also prohibit telecommunications service providers to hamper foreign device attachment to their networks provided the device would neither damage nor degrade the network. Telecommunications service providers would furthermore be obligated to render available to users at all time information about the speed, limitations and management practices that are in effect.

History
The Bill is a re-submitted version of Bill C-552 which was introduced one day after 300 protesters came to Parliament in May 2008. The Net Neutrality movement in Canada had accelerated since telecom providers Bell Canada and Rogers were found to have throttled their users P2P traffic. Liberal MP David McGuinty had followed closely on the heels of Mr. Angus' first private member initiative with a private Bill of his own, C-555.

References

Internet in Canada
Net neutrality
Canadian federal legislation
Proposed laws of Canada
2009 in Canadian law